Motorrad is the German word for motorcycle.

 Motorrad (magazine), German motorcycle magazine
 BMW Motorrad, a motorcycle brand
 Motorrad (film), a 2017 Brazilian film